Farrokh Pey (also known as Sa‘dūnī) is a village in Nasar Rural District, Arvandkenar District, Abadan County, Khuzestan Province, Iran. At the 2006 census, its population was 523, in 97 families.

References 

Populated places in Abadan County